The 2016 Open Castilla y León was a professional tennis tournament played on outdoor hard courts. It was the 31st edition, for men, and 2nd edition, for women, of the tournament and part of the 2016 ATP Challenger Tour and the 2016 ITF Women's Circuit, offering totals of €64,000+H, for men, and $10,000, for women, in prize money. It took place in El Espinar, Segovia, Spain, on 25–31 July 2016.

Men's singles main draw entrants

Seeds 

 1 Rankings as of 18 July 2016.

Other entrants 
The following player received a wildcard into the singles main draw:
  Nicolás Almagro
  Jorge Hernando Ruano
  Akira Santillan
  Ricardo Villacorta-Alonso

The following players received entry into the singles main draw with a protected ranking:
  Rémi Boutillier
  Albano Olivetti

The following players received entry from the qualifying draw:
  Daniel Cox
  Alex De Minaur
  Viktor Durasovic
  Jaume Pla Malfeito

Women's singles main draw entrants

Seeds 

 1 Rankings as of 18 July 2016.

Other entrants 
The following player received a wildcard into the singles main draw:
  Arabela Fernández Rabener
  Michaela Hončová
  Claudia Hoste Ferrer
  Ana Román Domínguez

The following players received entry from the qualifying draw:
  Lucy Brown
  Alba Carrillo Marín
  Yésica de Lucas
  Jazzamay Drew
  Ángela Fita Boluda
  Lucía Marzal Martínez
  Yuriko Miyazaki
  Giorgia Pinto

The following player received entry by a lucky loser spot:
  Laura Sainsbury

Champions

Men's singles

 Luca Vanni def.  Illya Marchenko, 6–4, 3–6, 6–3.

Women's singles
 Jessika Ponchet def.  Rocío de la Torre Sánchez, 6–4, 6–2

Men's doubles

 Purav Raja /  Divij Sharan def.  Quino Muñoz /  Akira Santillan, 6–3, 4–6, [10–8]

Women's doubles
 Charlotte Römer /  Sarah-Rebecca Sekulic def.  Jessika Ponchet /  Ioana Loredana Roșca, 6–2, 7–6(7–4)

External links 
 2016 Open Castilla y León at ITFtennis.com
 Official website 

2016 ITF Women's Circuit
2016 ATP Challenger Tour
2016 in Spanish tennis
July 2016 sports events in Europe
Tennis tournaments in Spain
2016 Open Castilla y León